Erika Alarcón is a Paraguayan roller skater. She participated at the 2022 South American Games in the roller sports competition, being awarded the gold medal in the women's solo dance event. She was the third person to win a gold medal for Paraguay in the competition.

References 

Living people
Artistic roller skaters
Place of birth missing (living people)
Year of birth missing (living people)
Competitors at the 2022 South American Games
South American Games medalists in roller sports
South American Games gold medalists for Paraguay
21st-century Paraguayan women